Gerhard Paul Hochschild (April 29, 1915 in Berlin – July 8, 2010 in El Cerrito, California) was a German-born American mathematician who worked on Lie groups, algebraic groups, homological algebra and algebraic number theory.

Early life 
On April 29, 1915, Hochschild was born to a  middle-class Jewish family in Berlin, Germany, the son of Lilli and Heinrich Hochschild. Hochschild had an older brother. His father was a patent attorney who had an engineering degree. After the rise of the National Socialist German Workers' Party in 1933, his father sent him to South Africa where he was able to enroll in school with funding from the Hochschild Family Foundation established by Berthold Hochschild, a cousin of his grandfather.

Education 
In 1936, Hochschild earned a BS degree in mathematics from University of Cape Town in Union of South Africa. In 1937, Hochschild earned a MS degree in mathematics from University of Cape Town.
In 1941, Hochschild earned his PhD in mathematics from Princeton University. Hochschild completed his thesis in 1941 at Princeton University with Claude Chevalley on Semisimple Algebras and Generalized Derivations.

Career 
In 1956–7 Hochschild was at the Institute for Advanced Study. Hochschild was a professor at University of Illinois at Urbana-Champaign. In the late 1950s Hochschild was a professor at University of California, Berkeley.

 introduced Hochschild cohomology, a cohomology theory for algebras, which classifies deformations of algebras.  introduced cohomology into class field theory. Along with Bertram Kostant and Alex F. T. W. Rosenberg, the Hochschild–Kostant–Rosenberg theorem is named after him.

Among his students were Andrzej Białynicki-Birula and James Ax.

In 1955, Hochschild was a Guggenheim Fellow. In 1979 Hochschild was elected to the National Academy of Sciences, and in 1980 he was awarded the Leroy P. Steele Prize of the AMS.

In 1982, Hochschild retired but continued teaching part-time until 1985.

Personal life 
In July 1950, Hochschild married Ruth Heinsheimer. Ruth was born in Germany and fled with her mother in 1939; the couple met at the University of Illinois where she was earning her M.S. in mathematics and Gerhard was working as an assistant professor. Hochschild's children are Ann Hochschild (b. 1955) and Peter Hochschild (b. 1957).

On July 8, 2010, Hochschild died at his home. Hochschild was 95.

See also
Hochschild–Mostow group

Publications

References

External links 

 
 Pictures of Gerhard Hochschild from Oberwolfach
  Finding Aid to the Gerhard P. Hochschild papers, 1941-2004, The Bancroft Library
 Hochschild Family Foundation at foundation center.org

20th-century American mathematicians
21st-century American mathematicians
Algebraists
1915 births
2010 deaths
Princeton University alumni
University of Cape Town alumni
University of Illinois Urbana-Champaign faculty
University of California, Berkeley College of Letters and Science faculty
Members of the United States National Academy of Sciences
People from Berlin
German emigrants to the United States
Gerhard